Inversions is the second extended play album by American rock band The Colourist.  Released on 28 October 2014, the album contains remixes of five songs from the eponymous debut LP from the band by recording artists such as The Chainsmokers, St. Lucia, Yeasayer, Magic Man and The Jane Doze.

Background 
In early 2013, Jean-Philip Grobler (also known as St. Lucia) remixed "Little Games", the debut single from the band, which was portrayed on Vice Media.  In the middle of that year, MTV published the Magic Man Remix of "Yes Yes" with Baeble Music and Hellhound Music featuring The Chainsmokers remix of "Fix This" at the end of that year.  Four months prior, debut EP Lido was published with their debut studio album being released during the first quarter of 2014.  In early October 2014, The Colourist remix of "Say You Need Me" from the LP was debuted in preparation for the release of the EP.  One month following the release of the six song production, Culture Collide debuted the video for the same song.

Critical reception 
The St. Lucia remix of "Little Games" was rated as the No.1 song on Hype Machine.  Vice Media stated that St. Lucia "pulls a warm Balearic blanket over the original, sanding away its rough edges with bright synths and lightly gated percussion" with Invisible Children describing the work as "total re-imagination and made specifically for after-hour parties".

Brooke Ferguson of The Music Ninja stated that "Say You Need Me" is "guaranteed going to make you want to groove like never before" with Ian Hays of Culture Collide describing the song as getting "an ‘80s makeover" with an "‘80s theme [extending] to the video itself".

Track listing

References

External links

2014 EPs
Indie pop EPs
The Colourist albums